Folk beat n°1 (1967) is the first album of Italian singer-songwriter Francesco Guccini. It was published under the name "Francesco" alone.

The record is, as the title suggests, a folk album, intended to adapt the genre within a contemporary Italian context parallel to the music of Phil Ochs or Bob Dylan. Folk beat n.1 deals with various themes, including critiques and satires of Italian society, as well as tragic accounts of both fictional and historical characters (two lyrical fields which would become commonly associated with the cantautore).

The album itself received little recognition once released, though it is said to contain amongst Guccini's most popular songs, which would later become blueprints for his style (including his particular accent, characteristic of the Emilia-Romagna region). The record received a stellar review from Allmusic, where it was said to contain the foundations for his successful career, and be the first showcase of Guccini's songwriting talent; his voice was also deemed "compelling".

The album
The album was recorded in studio Basilica di Milano in the summer of 1966 and produced by Odoardo "Dodo" Veroli; album was published in March 1967.

The album contains some songs previously written by Guccini  for other groups, including Equipe 84 and Nomadi.

Personnel
Francesco Guccini - Voice, Rhythm guitar
Antonio Roveri - Golo guitar
Alan Cooper - Armonica and Rhythm guitar

Track listing
 "Noi non ci saremo" - 5:15
 "In morte di S.F." - 3:41
 "Venerdì santo" - 4:19
 "L'atomica cinese" - 2:37
 "Auschwitz"- 4:40
 "Talkin' Milano" - 5:30
 "Statale 17" - 3:12
 "Il 3 dicembre del '39" - 3:44
 "La ballata degli annegati" - 2:28
 "Il sociale e l'antisociale" - 5:33

Note: "In morte di S.F." is the song known today as "Canzone per un'amica".

References

1966 debut albums
Francesco Guccini albums
Italian-language albums